The Dhammacakkappavattana Sutta (Pali; Sanskrit: Dharmacakrapravartana Sūtra; English: The Setting in Motion of the Wheel of the Dhamma Sutta or Promulgation of the Law Sutta) is a Buddhist scripture that is considered by Buddhists to be a record of the first sermon given by Gautama Buddha, the Sermon in the Deer Park at Sarnath. The main topic of this sutta is the Four Noble Truths, which refer to and express the basic orientation of Buddhism in a formulaic expression. This sutta also refers to the Buddhist concepts of the Middle Way, impermanence, and dependent origination.

According to Buddhist tradition, the Buddha delivered this discourse on the day of Asalha Puja, in the month of Ashadha, in a deer sanctuary in Isipatana. This was seven weeks after he attained Enlightenment. His audience consisted of five ascetics who had been his former companions: Kondañña, Assaji, Bhaddiya, Vappa, and Mahānāma.

Definitions
Dhamma (Pāli) or dharma (Sanskrit) can mean a variety of things depending on its context; in this context, it refers to the Buddha's teachings or his "truth" that leads to one's liberation from suffering.  Cakka (Pāli) or cakra (Sanskrit) can be translated as "wheel."  The dhammacakka, which can be translated as "Dhamma-Wheel," is a Buddhist symbol referring to  Buddha's teaching of the path to enlightenment.  Pavattana (Pāli) can be translated as "turning" or "rolling" or "setting in motion."

Text
The sutra contains the following topics:
 The two extremes to be avoided (sensual indulgence and self-mortification)
 The Middle Way
 The Four Noble Truths
 The Noble Eightfold Path
 The Twelve Insights of the Four Noble Truths
 Proclamation of release from the cycle of rebirth (commonly referred to as nibbana)
 The Opening of the Dhamma Eye (the attainment of right view)
 Proclamation of the devas upon the setting of the Wheel of Dhamma in motion by the Buddha
 Response of the Buddha to Aññā Kondañña's comprehension of his teachings

Buddhist understanding of the sutta

According to the Buddhist tradition, the Dhammacakkappavattana Sutta is the first teaching given by the Buddha after he attained enlightenment. According to Buddhist tradition, the Buddha attained enlightenment and liberation while meditating under the Bodhi Tree by the Nerañjarā river in Bodh Gaya. Afterwards, he remained silent for forty-nine days. According to MN 26 and MĀ 204, after deciding to teach, the Buddha initially intended to visit his former teachers, Āḷāra Kālāma and Uddaka Rāmaputta, to teach them his insights, but they had already died and born in a place where it is not apt to preach or they were deaf, so he decided to visit his five former companions. On his way, he encountered a spiritual seeker named Upaka. The Buddha proclaimed that he had achieved full awakening, but Upaka was not convinced and "took a different path".The Buddha then journeyed from Bodhgaya to Sarnath, a small town near the sacred city of Varanasi in central India. There he met his five former companions, the ascetics with whom he had shared six years of hardship. His former companions were at first suspicious of the Buddha, thinking he had given up his search for the truth when he renounced their ascetic ways. But upon seeing the radiance of the Buddha, they requested him to teach what he had learned. Thereupon the Buddha gave the teaching that was later recorded as the Dhammacakkappavattana Sutta, which introduces fundamental concepts of Buddhist thought, such as the Middle Way and the Four Noble Truths.

Development of the sutta

Retaining the oldest teachings
Modern scholars agree that the teachings of the Buddha were passed down in an oral tradition for approximately a few hundred years after the passing of the Buddha; the first written recordings of these teachings were made hundreds of years after the Buddha's passing. According to academic scholars, inconsistencies in the oldest texts may reveal developments in the oldest teachings.{{refn|See:
 La Vallee Possin (1937), Musila et Narada; reprinted in Gombrich (2006), How Buddhism Began, appendix
 Erich Frauwallner (1953), Geschichte der indischen Philosophie, Band  Der Buddha und der Jina (pp. 147-272)
 Andre Bareau (1963), Recherches sur la biographiedu Buddha dans les Sutrapitaka et les Vinayapitaka anciens, Ecole Francaise d'Extreme-Orient
 Schmithausen, On some Aspects of Descriptions or Theories of 'Liberating Insight' and 'Enlightenment' in Early Buddhism. In: Studien zum Jainismus und Buddhismus (Gedenkschrift für Ludwig Alsdorf), hrsg. von Klaus Bruhn und Albrecht Wezler, Wiesbaden 1981, 199-250.
 
 K.R. Norman, [https://web.archive.org/web/20160309183447/http://ahandfulofleaves.org/documents/articles/the%20four%20noble%20truths_norman_pts_2003.pdf Four Noble Truths]
 
 Tilman Vetter (1988), The Ideas and Meditative Practices of Early Buddhism, by Tilmann Vetter
 , chapter four
 
 Alexander Wynne (2007), The Origin of Buddhist Meditation, Routledge|name="development of teachings"|group=note}} While the Theravada tradition holds that it is likely that the sutras date back to the Buddha himself, in an unbroken chain of oral transmission,* academic scholars have identified many of such inconsistencies, and tried to explain them. Information of the oldest teachings of Buddhism, such as on the Four Noble Truths, which are an important topic in the Dhammacakkappavattana Sutta, has been obtained by analysis of the oldest texts and these inconsistencies, and are a matter of ongoing discussion and research.

Development of the sutta
According to Bronkhorst this "first sermon" is recorded in several sutras, with important variations. In the Vinaya texts, and in the Dhammacakkappavattana Sutta which was influenced by the Vinaya texts, the four truths are included, and Kondañña is enlightened when the "vision of Dhamma" arises in him: "whatever is subject to origination is all subject to cessation." Yet, in the Ariyapariyesanā Sutta ("The Noble Search", Majjhima Nikaya 26) the four truths are not included, and the Buddha gives the five ascetics personal instructions in turn, two or three of them, while the others go out begging for food. The versions of the "first sermon" which include the four truths, such as the Dhammacakkappavattana Sutta, omit this instruction, showing that

According to Bronkhorst, this indicates that the four truths were later added to earlier descriptions of liberation by practicing the four dhyanas, which originally was thought to be sufficient for the destruction of the arsavas. Anderson, following Norman, also thinks that the four truths originally were not part of this sutta, and were later added in some versions. According to Bronkhorst, the "twelve insights" are probably also a later addition, born out of unease with the substitution of the general term "prajna" for the more specific "four truths".

The "essence" of Buddhism

According to Cousins, many scholars are of the view that "this discourse was identified as the first sermon of the Buddha only at a later date." According to Richard Gombrich,

Yet, the understanding of what exactly constituted this "very essence" also developed over time. What exactly was regarded as the central insight "varied along with what was considered most central to the teaching of the Buddha."  "Liberating insight" came to be defined as "insight into the four truths," which is presented as the "liberating insight" which constituted the awakening, or "enlightenment" of the Buddha. When he understood these truths he was "enlightened" and liberated, as reflected in Majjhima Nikaya 26:42: "his taints are destroyed by his seeing with wisdom." The four truths were superseded by pratityasamutpada, and still later by the doctrine of the non-existence of a substantial self or person.

According to Anderson, a long recognized feature of the Theravada canon is that it lacks an "overarching and comprehensive structure of the path to nibbana." The sutras form a network or matrix, which have to be taken together. Within this network, "the four noble truths are one doctrine among others and are not particularly central," but are a part of "the entire dhamma matrix." The four noble truths are set and learnt in that network, learning "how the various teachings intersect with each other," and refer to the various Buddhist techniques, which are all explicitly and implicitly part of the passages which refer to the four truths. According to Anderson,

Translations into English

From the Pali version
In the Pāli Canon, this sutta is found in the Samyutta Nikaya, chapter 56 ("Saccasamyutta" or "Connected Discourses on the Truths"), sutta number 11 (and, thus, can be referenced as "SN 56.11").  There are multiple English translations of the Pali version of this sutta, including:

 Bhikkhu Bodhi (trans.), Setting in Motion the Wheel of the Dhamma
 Ñanamoli Thera (trans.) (1993). Dhammacakkappavattana Sutta: Setting Rolling the Wheel of Truth.  
Piyadassi Thera (trans.) (1999). Dhammacakkappavattana Sutta: Setting in Motion the Wheel of Truth. 
Thanissaro Bhikkhu (trans.) (1993). Dhammacakkappavattana Sutta: Setting the Wheel of Dhamma in Motion. 
Bhikkhu Sujato (trans.) (2018). Rolling Forth the Wheel of Dhamma.
 Thich Nhat Hanh (trans.) (1999). "Discourse on Turning the Wheel of the Dharma: Dhamma Cakka Pavattana Sutta". In The Heart of the Buddha's Teaching, p. 257.
 Ven. Dr. Rewata Dhamma (trans.) (1997). "The First Discourse of the Buddha: Turning the Wheel of Dhamma". In The First Discourse of the Buddha, Wisdom, pp. 17–20.
 Walpola Rahula (trans.) (2007). "Setting in Motion the Wheel of Truth". In What the Buddha Taught.

From Tibetan, Chinese and Sanskrit versions
 The Tibetan ‘Missing Translator’s Colophon’ Version of the Dharma Wheel Discourse (chos kyi ‘khor lo’i mdo ‘gyur byang med pa): A New Translation into English by Erick Tsiknopoulos (2013) This is a translation of one of two versions of the Dharma Wheel Sutra in Tibetan, known as the 'Missing Translator's Colophon' version (Tib: 'gyur byang med pa). It has a correlate in Chinese, translated into English by Lapiz Lazuli Texts and listed below.
 Lapis Lazuli Texts: Saṃyuktāgama 379. Turning the Dharma Wheel. This is a translation from the Chinese canon; the Chinese version is based on the Sarvastivadin Sanskrit version of the text (Dharmacakra Pravartana Sutra).
 Thich Nhat Hanh has produced a notable rendering of the first teaching of the Buddha in his biography of the Buddha entitled Old Path White Clouds. Thich Nhat Hanh relied on multiple sources for this rendering. This rendering is also included in Thich Nhat Hanh's book Path of Compassion: Stories from the Buddha's Life. See Turning the Wheel of Dharma

The 26th chapter of the Lalitavistara Sutra contains a Mahayana version of the first turning that closely parallels the Dhammacakkappavattana Sutta. The following English translations of this text are available:
 The Play in Full: Lalitavistara (2013), translated by the Dharmachakra Translation Committee. Translated from Tibetan into English and checked against the Sanskrit version.
 Voice of the Buddha: The Beauty of Compassion (1983), translated by Gwendolyn Bays, Dharma Publishing (two-volume set). This translation has been made from French into English and then checked with the original in Tibetan and Sanskrit.

See alsoAnattalakkhaṇa SuttaAsalha Puja
Buddha's Dispensation 
Enlightenment in Buddhism
Four Noble Truths
Middle Way
Noble Eightfold Path
Sarnath
Taṇhā
Three marks of existence

Notes

Subnotes

References

Sources

Printed sources
Pali Canon

 
 

Buddhist teachers

 Anandajoti Bhikkhu (trans.) (2010). The Earliest Recorded Discourses of the Buddha (from Lalitavistara, Mahākhandhaka & Mahāvastu).  Kuala Lumpur: Sukhi Hotu. Also available on-line.
 
 
 
 
 
 
 
 
 
 

Secondary

 
 
 
 
 
 
 
 
 
 
 
 
 
 
 
 
 

Web-sources

Further reading
Scholarly
 
 Analayo, V (2012). The Chinese Parallels to the Dhammacakkappavattana-sutta (1), Journal of the Oxford Centre for Buddhist Studies 3, 12-46
 Analayo, V (2013). The Chinese Parallels to the Dhammacakkappavattana-sutta (2), Journal of the Oxford Centre for Buddhist Studies 5, 9-41

Commentaries in English
 Ajahn Sucitto (2010), Turning the Wheel of Truth: Commentary on the Buddha's First Teaching, Shambhala
 Bhikkhu Pesala, An Exposition of the Dhammacakka Sutta
 Mahasi Sayadaw (1996–2012), Discourse on the Wheel of Dharma
 Ven. Dr. Rewata Dhamma (1997), The First Discourse of the Buddha'', Wisdom, .

External links

Saṃyutta Nikāya 56.11 Dhammacakkappavattana Sutta: Setting the Wheel of Dhamma in Motion translated from the Pali by Thanissaro Bhikkhu with links to alternative translations.
Saṃyukta Āgama version translated into English
Dhammacakkappavattana Sutta read aloud (talking book) by Guy Armstrong
Romanized Pāli version with English translation
 Resources for researching the Buddha's First Sutta - contains links to seven different translations by notable Theravada translators 
Word-by-word semantic analysis with translation on the side
 An Exposition of the Dhammacakka Sutta by Bhikkhu Pesala

Samyutta Nikaya
Gautama Buddha
Sarnath